Chionanthus porcatus grows as a tree up to  tall, with a trunk diameter of up to . The bark is white or dark grey. The flowers are greenish yellow or white. The specific epithet porcatus is from the Latin meaning "ridged", referring to the fruit. Habitat is forests from sea-level to  altitude. C. porcatus is endemic to Borneo.

References

porcatus
Plants described in 1980
Endemic flora of Borneo
Trees of Borneo